Kharitonovskaya is a rural locality (a village) in Spasskoye Rural Settlement, Tarnogsky District, Vologda Oblast, Russia. The population was 14 as of 2002.

Geography 
Kharitonovskaya is located 34 km northwest of Tarnogsky Gorodok (the district's administrative centre) by road. Tselkovskaya is the nearest rural locality.

References 

Rural localities in Tarnogsky District